ASC Kara is a Togolese football club from the city of Kara.

The club won the 2018–19 Togolese Championnat National.

References

Football clubs in Togo